The 1983 NCAA Men's Water Polo Championship was the 15th annual NCAA Men's Water Polo Championship to determine the national champion of NCAA men's college water polo. Tournament matches were played at the Belmont Plaza Pool in Long Beach, California during December 1983.

California defeated USC in the final, 10–7, to win their fifth national title. Coached by Pete Cutino, the Golden Bears finished the season 29–3–2.

Jeff Campbell (UC Irvine), Peter Cutino (California), and Alan Gresham (California) were named the Co-Most Outstanding Players of the tournament. An All-Tournament Team, consisting of eight players, was also named. 

The tournament's leading scorer was Dan O'Connell from Loyola–Chicago (11 goals).

Qualification
Since there has only ever been one single national championship for water polo, all NCAA men's water polo programs (whether from Division I, Division II, or Division III) were eligible. A total of 8 teams were invited to contest this championship. Nonetheless, Slippery Rock became the first team from outside Division I to qualify for the championship tournament.

Bracket
Site: Belmont Plaza Pool, Long Beach, California

{{8TeamBracket-Consols
| team-width=150
| RD3=First round
| RD4=Championship semifinals
| RD2=Consolation semifinals
| RD5=Championship
| RD5b=Third place
| RD1=Fifth place
| RD1b=Seventh place

| RD3-seed1= | RD3-team1=California | RD3-score1=15
| RD3-seed2= | RD3-team2=Slippery Rock | RD3-score2=2
| RD3-seed3= | RD3-team3=Long Beach State (2OT) | RD3-score3=10
| RD3-seed4= | RD3-team4=UCLA | RD3-score4=8
| RD3-seed5= | RD3-team5=USC | RD3-score5=12
| RD3-seed6= | RD3-team6=Brown | RD3-score6=4
| RD3-seed7= | RD3-team7=UC Irvine| RD3-score7=12| RD3-seed8= | RD3-team8= Loyola–Chicago | RD3-score8=8

| RD4-seed1= | RD4-team1=California | RD4-score1=8| RD4-seed2= | RD4-team2=Long Beach State | RD4-score2=5
| RD4-seed3= | RD4-team3=USC | RD4-score3=9| RD4-seed4= | RD4-team4=UC Irvine | RD4-score4=8

| RD2-seed1= | RD2-team1=Slippery Rock | RD2-score1=4
| RD2-seed2= | RD2-team2=UCLA | RD2-score2=15| RD2-seed3= | RD2-team3=Brown (2OT) | RD2-score3=13| RD2-seed4= | RD2-team4=Loyola–Chicago | RD2-score4=11

| RD5-seed1= | RD5-team1=California | RD5-score1=10| RD5-seed2= | RD5-team2=USC | RD5-score2=7

| RD5b-seed1= | RD5b-team1=Long Beach State | RD5b-score1=9
| RD5b-seed2= | RD5b-team2=UC Irvine | RD5b-score2=6

| RD1-seed1= | RD1-team1=UCLA | RD1-score1=9
| RD1-seed2= | RD1-team2=Brown | RD1-score2=3

| RD1b-seed1= | RD1b-team1=Slippery Rock | RD1b-score1=5
| RD1b-seed2= | RD1b-team2=Loyola–Chicago | RD1b-score2=12}}

 All-tournament team Jeff Campbell, UC Irvine (Co-Most outstanding player)Peter Cutino, California (Co-Most outstanding player)Alan Gresham, California (Co-Most outstanding player)
Jim Birdsell, Long Beach State
Shaun Cleary, California
Mike Evans, UC Irvine
Dan O'Connell, Loyola–ChicagoNote:' O'Connell was the only player from a team outside the state of California to be named to an all-tournament team during its 8-team format''
Mike Spicer, USC

See also 
 NCAA Men's Water Polo Championship

References

NCAA Men's Water Polo Championship
NCAA Men's Water Polo Championship
1983 in sports in California
December 1983 sports events in the United States
1983